Newtown is an inner western suburb of Geelong, Victoria, Australia. It is a primarily residential area occupying one of the highest points of urban Geelong, has always been a desirable place of residence and it is the location of many of Geelong's oldest and most valuable properties.

The locality of Chilwell is part of Newtown, and together Newtown and Chilwell were a municipality from 1858 to 1993 after which they were amalgamated with other municipalities to form the City of Greater Geelong in 1993.

History

Chilwell Post Office opened here on 1 April 1912 (closing in 1993). Bareena Post Office opened in 1911 in the area and remains open.

The Geelong Highland Gathering is an annual Highland Games held at Queens Park and first began in the 1850s.

Heritage listed sites

Newtown contains a number of heritage listed sites, including:

 7 Aberdeen Street, Aberdeen Street Baptist Church
 263 Pakington Street, Armytage House
 35-43 Riversdale Road, Barwon Bank
 25 Fernleigh Street, Barwon Grange
 143 Noble Street, Claremont
 3 Aberdeen Street, Former Aberdeen Street Baptist Church
 20 Talbot Street, Geelong College
 35 Aphrasia Street, Eythorne
 275 Pakington Street, Keyham
 145 Noble Street, Miharo
 14 Aphrasia Street, Milton
 35 Noble Street, Noble Street Uniting Church
 50B Skene Street, Rannoch House
 61 Retreat Road, Sacred Heart Convent of Mercy and Sacred Heart College
 262 Latrobe Terrace, St Leonards
 140 Aphrasia Street, The Heights

Sport and Recreation
Queens Park is also the home ground for the Newtown and Chilwell Cricket Club, the most successful team in the Geelong Cricket Association in terms of senior premierships won.  The club uses both Stinton Oval (turf) and Shaw Oval (hard wicket).  The Queens Park Sporting Complex is currently being refurbished by the City of Greater Geelong and will greatly improve both playing and social facilities for the club.  Famous cricketers who played for Newtown include the young Lindsay Hassett, Aaron Finch and Ian Redpath.  Bob Merriman, the former Chairman of Cricket Australia, began his administrative career at Newtown and Chilwell Cricket Club.

The suburb is also home to the Geelong Amateur Football Club who also use Stinton Oval during the winter months. They play in the Bellarine Football League.

The suburb in conjunction with neighbouring area Chilwell has an Australian Rules football team competing in the Geelong Football League, as  also does Saint Josephs.

Queens Park, located on the Barwon River is home to the picturesque 18 hole Queens Park Golf Course, located in a valley between Fyansford, Highton and Newtown.

Parks and Open Space
Newtown has several significant parks, including Queens Park, Balyang Sanctuary, Chilwell Gardens, Windmill Reserve, Fyans Park, Zillah Crawcour Park and Frier Reserve.

Education

Newtown is home to three private secondary schools in the Geelong area, Sacred Heart College (an all-girls school), St. Josephs College (an all-boys school) and The Geelong College.

Notable people 
 John Campbell Ross, Australian supercentenarian

References

External links
 Geelong Highland Gathering
 Newtown and Chilwell Cricket Club

Suburbs of Geelong